Ten'ja (Arabic: تينجا, English title Testament) is a 2004 Arabic-language French-Moroccan film directed by Hassan Legzouli, written by the director and Emmanuelle Sardou. The film stars Roschdy Zem, Aure Atika, and Abdou El Mesnaoui.

References

2004 films
Moroccan drama films